Teun van Grunsven (born 30 October 1999) is a Dutch professional footballer who plays as a centre-back for FC Den Bosch.

Career
In 2018 Van Grunsven left RKSV to join OSS '20. Playing for Oss led to professional interest in his development. He signed with RKC Waalwijk ahead of the 2019-20 season but only played for Jong RKC. He joined FC Den Bosch from RKC Waalwijk in the winter of the 2020-21 however injury kept him from playing the rest of that season for his new club. He made his senior debut in the opening fixture of the 2021-22 season. Van Grunsven signed a new professional contract with Den Bosch a month later in September 2021. On September 9, 2022, Van Grunsven scored his first goal in professional football in an away match against   FC Dordrecht.

References

External links

1999 births
Living people
Dutch footballers
FC Den Bosch players 
Eerste Divisie players